Sam Keen (born 1931) is an American author, professor, and philosopher who is best known for his exploration of questions regarding love, life, wonder, religion, and being a male in contemporary society. He co-produced Faces of the Enemy, an award-winning PBS documentary; was the subject of a Bill Moyers' television special in the early 1990s; and for 20 years served as a contributing editor at Psychology Today magazine. He is also featured in the 2003 documentary Flight from Death.

Keen completed his undergraduate studies at Ursinus College in Collegeville, Pennsylvania, and later completed graduate degrees at Harvard University and Princeton University.

Keen is married to Patricia de Jong, who is a former senior minister of First Congregational Church of Berkeley, United Church of Christ, in Berkeley, California.

Books

In print
Prodigal Father, Wayward Son (2015)
In the Absence of God: Dwelling in the Presence of the Sacred (2010)
Sightings: Extraordinary Encounters with Ordinary Birds (Chronicle Books, 2007)
Learning to Fly: Reflections on Fear, Trust, and the Joy of Letting Go (1999)
To Love and Be Loved (Bantam, 1997)
Hymns to an Unknown God (Bantam, 1994)
Inward Bound: Exploring the Geography of Your Emotions (Bantam, 1992)
Fire in the Belly: On Being a Man (Bantam, 1991)
Your Mythic Journey (Tarcher, 1990)
Faces of the Enemy. Reflections of the Hostile Imagination. (Harper and Row, San Francisco 1986)

Out of print
The Passionate Life (Harper and Row)
Beginnings Without End (Harper and Row, 1975)
To a Dancing God (Harper and Row, 1970)
Apology for Wonder (Harper and Row, 1969)
Gabriel Marcel (John Knox Press, 1967)

See also
American philosophy
List of American philosophers
Mythopoeic thought

References

External links

Official site
Famous Quotes By Sam Keen
Sam Keen MP3 audio - from Shift in Action, sponsored by Institute of Noetic Sciences
Ancients were ahead of their time, The Sydney Morning Herald, Paul Sheehan, October 16, 2006.
Flight From Death on Hulu

20th-century American philosophers
21st-century American philosophers
American spiritual writers
Harvard University alumni
Princeton University alumni
Men's movement in the United States
Ursinus College alumni
Living people
1931 births
Place of birth missing (living people)